Natacha Karam is a Northern Irish and French Lebanese actress. She is best known for her roles as Jasmine "Jaz" Khan in The Brave and Marjan Marwani in 9-1-1: Lone Star.

Background
Karam was born in Jeddah where her family was stationed to a Northern Irish mother and a French-Lebanese father. Her family moved around while Karam was growing up; places she lived included Ireland, Saudi Arabia, Jordan, Bahrain, and Dubai. Karam completed her A Levels at Dubai College in 2012. She went on to study at the City Literary Institute in London, graduating in 2014.

Career
Karam began her acting career in 2017, with one-off appearances in television series Silent Witness and Homeland, along with an appearance in the TV film Valentine's Again. She landed her first major role later that year, when she was cast as Sergeant Jasmine "Jaz" Khan on the military action drama series The Brave, which ran for one season consisting of 13 episodes on NBC.

In 2018, Karam made an appearance in the film The Hurricane Heist, and in 2019, she appeared in an episode of the 34th season of the TV series Casualty. Since 2020, she has been part of the main cast of the procedural drama series 9-1-1: Lone Star on Fox, playing the role of firefighter Marjan Marwani. Karam also appeared in the 2020 Netflix film The Old Guard, in which she played the role of Dizzy.

Filmography

Film

Television films

Television series

References

External links
 Natacha Karam at IMDb

1995 births
21st-century British actresses
21st-century actresses from Northern Ireland
Actresses from London
British film actresses
British television actresses
British people of French descent
British people of Lebanese descent
British people of Northern Ireland descent
Living people